Abacetus franzi is a species of ground beetle in the subfamily Pterostichinae. It was described by Straneo in 1961.

References

franzi
Beetles described in 1961